Little Sutton may refer to several places in England:

 Little Sutton, Cheshire
Little Sutton railway station
 Little Sutton, Chiswick
 Little Sutton, Lincolnshire
 Little Sutton, Shropshire, a location in Diddlebury parish